Most Churches of Kerala follow the tradition of Syrian Christians known as Saint Thomas Christians also called Syrian Christians of India, Nasrani or Malankara Nasrani or Nasrani Mappila. Remaining are Latin Catholics and a minority of Protestant Christians.

St. Thomas, disciple of Lord Jesus Christ, is claimed to have visited India and founded eight churches in Kerala, the foremost being St. Mary's Church  at a place called Niranam near Thiruvalla.  It is a Historical Monument today and many ancient relics are still preserved in the museum there.

List of Metropolitan of all Episcopal Churches in India
This is a list of Metropolitans who served the church like Syro-Malankara Catholic Church, Jacobite Syrian Christian Church, Malankara Orthodox Syrian Church, Mar Thoma Syrian Church of Malabar, Chaldean Syrian Church, Malabar Independent Syrian Church, St. Thomas Evangelical Church of India, and Malankara Evangelical Church.

See also
 Syro-Malankara Catholic Church
 Syro-Malabar Church
 Jacobite Syrian Christian Church 
 Malankara Orthodox Syrian Church
 Mar Thoma Syrian Church of Malabar
 Chaldean Syrian Church
 Malabar Independent Syrian Church
 St. Thomas Evangelical Church of India

References

 https://catholicate.net
 http://www.syromalabarchurch.in
 http://www.jscnews.org
 https://mosc.in
 https://marthoma.in
 http://www.churchoftheeastindia.org
 http://misc.co.in
 https://steci.org